Buljević is a Croatian family name.

Among those with the surname are:
Branko Buljević (born 1947), Croatian-born, naturalized Australian footballer
Damir Buljević (born 1965), Croatian tennis player
, Croatian writer and poet
 (born 1987), German basketball player
 (born 1957), Chilean bishop

References

Croatian surnames